The Australian Goldfields Open was a professional ranking snooker tournament. The final champion was John Higgins in 2015.

History
Australia had previously hosted the 1971 and 1975 World Snooker Championships, as well as several other high-profile snooker tournaments and in 1979 the Australian Masters was established. There was an attempt to turn the event into a ranking tournament in 1989 but the sponsorship fell through so it was staged in Hong Kong instead, as the Hong Kong Open, which incidentally became the first ranking tournament to be staged in Asia. The Hong Kong event was discontinued after just one year, but returned to Australia in 1994 as the Australian Open. The tournament reverted to being called the Australian Masters for the following season, but was dropped from the calendar after the 1995 event. In addition, the tournament was also held in 1995 as the Australian Open immediately following the Australian Masters, featuring mostly the same players and the same two players in the final. In 2011 the World Professional Billiards and Snooker Association resurrected the event under the Australian Goldfields Open name and added it to the 2011/2012 calendar.
The tournament's later incarnation providing the first ranking tournament victories for future World Champion Stuart Bingham and future world finalist Barry Hawkins and arguably resurrected the careers of these two players who had previously been considered journeyman professionals, who had previously hovered between the fringes of the top 16 and top 32.

In 2016, the event was quietly dropped from the calendar.

Winners

Notes

See also

Cue sports in Australia

References 

 
Recurring sporting events established in 1979
1979 establishments in Australia
Snooker ranking tournaments
Snooker competitions in Australia
Recurring sporting events disestablished in 2015
2015 disestablishments in Australia
Defunct snooker competitions
Defunct sports competitions in Australia